Norbert Nieroba (born 29 April 1964) is a German boxer. He competed in the men's light middleweight event at the 1988 Summer Olympics.

References

1964 births
Living people
Light-middleweight boxers
German male boxers
Olympic boxers of West Germany
Boxers at the 1988 Summer Olympics
Sportspeople from Gelsenkirchen